GDW may refer to:

 GDW (TV station), an Australian digital television channel
 Game Designers' Workshop
 GdW Bundesverband deutscher Wohnungs- und Immobilienunternehmen, a German housing co-op association
 Gladwin Zettel Memorial Airport, in Michigan, United States
 Memorial to the German Resistance, a museum in Berlin